Volodymyr Ivanovych Onyshchenko (born 28 October 1949 in Stechanka, Kyiv Oblast) is a former Ukrainian footballer and a current coach. He scored two goals as Dynamo Kyiv won the 1975 European Cup Winners' Cup Final.

Honours
 Soviet Top League winner: 1971, 1972, 1974, 1975, 1977.
 Soviet Cup winner: 1974, 1978.
 UEFA Cup Winners' Cup winner: 1975.
 UEFA Super Cup winner: 1975.
 UEFA Euro 1972 runner-up.
 Olympic bronze: 1972, 1976.

International career
He earned 44 caps for the USSR national football team, and participated in UEFA Euro 1972, and won two Olympic bronze medals.

External links
Profile 

1949 births
Living people
Ukrainian footballers
Soviet footballers
Soviet Union international footballers
UEFA Euro 1972 players
Soviet Top League players
FC Dynamo Kyiv players
FC Zorya Luhansk players
Olympic footballers of the Soviet Union
Footballers at the 1972 Summer Olympics
Footballers at the 1976 Summer Olympics
Olympic bronze medalists for the Soviet Union
Ukrainian football managers
FC Dynamo Kyiv managers
FC Metalurh Donetsk managers
Ukraine national under-21 football team managers
Ukrainian Premier League managers
Olympic medalists in football
FC Ros Bila Tserkva managers
FC Desna Chernihiv managers
Medalists at the 1976 Summer Olympics
Medalists at the 1972 Summer Olympics
Association football forwards
Sportspeople from Kyiv Oblast